Craig Ebert was an Australian rules footballer for  and  in the South Australian National Football League.

Port Adelaide 
Craig Ebert made his debut for Port Adelaide in 1981. He would appear in the 1984 SANFL Grand Final for the club. Port Adelaide would lose the match by 9 points. At the end of 1988 Craig would leave the club in search for more opportunities.

West Adelaide 
Craig Ebert joined West Adelaide for the 1989 SANFL season. He would play at the club for three years before retiring.

Personal life
He is the father of Brad Ebert, the brother of Russell Ebert and Jeff Ebert and the uncle of Brett Ebert.

References

Port Adelaide Football Club (SANFL) players
Port Adelaide Football Club players (all competitions)
Australian rules footballers from South Australia
West Adelaide Football Club players